Mélissa Verreault (born 1983) is a Canadian writer and translator from Montreal, Quebec. She is most noted as the winner of the Governor General's Award for English to French translation at the 2022 Governor General's Awards for Partie de chasse au petit gibier entre lâches au club de tir du coin, her translation of Megan Gail Coles's novel Small Game Hunting at the Local Coward Gun Club.

Works

Novels
Voyage léger, 2011 — 
L'angoisse du poisson rouge, 2014 — 
Les couleurs primaires 2016 — 
Les voies de la disparition, 2016 —

Short story collections
Point d'équilibre, 2012 —

Translations
Ligne brisée (Katherena Vermette, The Break), 2017 — 
Liminal (Jordan Tannahill), 2019 — 
Partie de chasse au petit gibier entre lâches au club de tir du coin (Megan Gail Coles, Small Game Hunting at the Local Coward Gun Club), 2021 — 
Ta gueule t'es belle (Téa Mutonji, Shut Up You're Pretty), 2021 —

References

1983 births
Living people
21st-century Canadian novelists
21st-century Canadian women writers
21st-century Canadian short story writers
Canadian novelists in French
Canadian short story writers in French
Canadian women novelists
Canadian women short story writers
21st-century Canadian translators
Governor General's Award-winning translators
French Quebecers
Writers from Montreal